Melicope rubra, commonly known as the little evodia, is a species of small tree in the family Rutaceae, and is endemic to north-east Queensland. It has trifoliate leaves and pink bisexual flowers arranged on branches below the leaves.

Description

Taxonomy
The little evodia was first formally described in 1900 by Carl Adolf Georg Lauterbach and Karl Moritz Schumann who gave it the name Euodia rubra and published the description in Schumann's book, Die Flora der Deutschen Schutzgebiete in der Sudsee. In 2001, Thomas Gordon Hartley changed the name to Melicope rubra in the journal Allertonia.

Habitat and distribution
It is found between Shiptons Flat and Cardwell in north-eastern Queensland.

Conservation status
This species is classified as of "least concern" under the Queensland Government Nature Conservation Act 1992.

References

rubra
Sapindales of Australia
Flora of Queensland
Plants described in 1900
Taxa named by Carl Adolf Georg Lauterbach
Taxa named by Karl Moritz Schumann